Kaleh Qatar may refer to:
 Kaleh Qatar-e Olya
 Kaleh Qatar-e Sofla